Khaled Mobayed (born Januari 10, 1993) is a Syrian football player who is currently playing for Jableh SC, on loan from Al-Wahda.

International career
Khaled Mobayed played for the Syria national football team six times in 2012. He also played in a friendly match against iraq in 2016.

International goals
Scores and results list Syria's goal tally first.

Honours

Club
Al Quwa Al Jawiya
AFC Cup: 2017

References

External links 

1993 births
Living people
Association football defenders
Syrian footballers
People from Hama
Syrian expatriate footballers
Taliya SC players
Expatriate footballers in Iraq
Syrian expatriates in Iraq
2019 AFC Asian Cup players
AFC Cup winning players
Syrian Premier League players
Syria international footballers